Acrodysostosis  is a rare congenital malformation syndrome which involves shortening of the interphalangeal joints of the hands and feet, intellectual disability in approximately 90% of affected children, and peculiar facies. Other common abnormalities include short head (as measured front to back), small broad upturned nose with flat nasal bridge, protruding jaw, increased bone age, intrauterine growth retardation, juvenile arthritis and short stature. Further abnormalities of the skin, genitals, teeth, and skeleton may occur.

Other common abnormalities include short head (as measured front to back), small broad upturned nose with flat nasal bridge, protruding jaw, increased bone age, intrauterine growth retardation, juvenile arthritis and short stature. Further abnormalities of the skin, genitals, teeth, and skeleton may occur.

Signs and Symptoms
Acrodysostosis presents with a wide spectrum of clinical manifestations. The following is a list of conditions and complications associated with acrodysostosis.

Bone issues
 Skeletal dysplasia (dwarfism, short stature) 
 Brachydactyly 
 Advanced bone age  
 Bone plate fusing  
 Scoliosis 
 Pain – joint, hip, lower back, wrist

Endocrine
 Hypothyroidism 
 Hypoparathyroidism 
 Pseudohypoparathyroidism 
 Vitamin D deficiency 
 Thyroid cysts 
 Type 1 diabetes

Behavioural / Developmental / Emotional
 Autism Spectrum Disorder (ASD) 
 Childhood Apraxia of Speech  
 Cognitive impairment 
 Sensory issues 
 Gross motor delays 
 Fine motor delays

Craniofacial and dental
 Cranial frontal nasal syndrome Midface hypoplasia 
 Depressed nasal bridge 
 Retrognathia 
 Glossoptosis 
 High palate 
 Mandibular distraction surgery Jaw surgery  
 Underbite 
 Chalky teeth  
 Overcrowded teeth 
 Early eruption of adult teeth 
 Small, unaligned teeth

Cardiology
 Hypertension  
 Atrial Septal Defect (ASD) 
 Aortic Coarctation 
 Middle Aortic Syndrome (MAS) Coarctation of abdominal aorta Bradycardia 
 Bicuspid aortic valve

Causes
Acrodysostosis is believed to be caused by mutations in the PRKAR1A gene (type 1) or the PDE4D gene (type 2). It has been suggested that the condition might be genetically related i.e. in an autosomal dominant mode of transmission. Both males and females are affected. The disorder has been associated with the older age of parents at the time of conception.

A PRKAR1A mutation has been identified in acrodysostosis with hormone resistance.

Diagnosis

Treatment
There are currently no approved treatments or standardised treatment guidelines for acrodysostosis. Management of acrodysostosis typically focuses on addressing specific symptoms that occur in each individual and may include surgery, physical therapy and special education.

Research
A number of transgenic mouse models have been generated that harbour genetic mutations within genes linked to the condition in humans. These mouse models exhibit phenotypes similar to that observed in Acrodysostosis in humans.

Media

The actress Olivia Colman partnered with the charity Acrodysostosis Support and Research to raise awareness for the disease. She participated in a promotional video campaign in December 2020.

References

External links
 
 
 

Congenital disorders
Rare diseases
Syndromes with craniofacial abnormalities